Chabula is a genus of moths of the family Crambidae.

Species
Chabula acamasalis (Walker, 1859)
Chabula vedonalis Swinhoe, 1894

References

Spilomelinae
Crambidae genera
Taxa named by Frederic Moore